Sandro iz Chegema, known in English as Sandro of Chegem, is a picaresque novel (or a parody thereof) by Abkhaz author Fazil Iskander, written in Russian and first published in the west in 1979-1981.

Publication and translation
According to Susan Jacoby, the novel was published in Russian in the early 1970s, but 90% of the text had fallen victim to Soviet censorship. An English translation (by Susan Brownsberger) was published in the United States in 1983 by Vintage. That translation is based on a publication of the novel by Ardis, published in 1979.

Content and structure
The chapters of the novel can stand separately, but form a "unified whole", according to Susan Jacoby. Iskander, in the foreword to the novel, said he started it as a "comic piece, a gentle parody of the picaresque novel". He also noted that "the book you are reading is in fact only part of the epic Sandro. Further episodes of the novel will be published in the future." A second volume on Sandro was published as Novye glavy in 1979/1981 by Ardis, and translated also by Susan Brownsberger and published in 1984 by Vintage.

Legacy and importance
The novel is frequently compared to the work of Mark Twain. According to the Moscow Times, "The strong regional flavor of the novel and its picaresque nature highlight Iskander's unique capacity for human observation".

References

Abkhaz literature
Picaresque novels
Russian books